Gerald LaVern Tarr (born August 27, 1939) is a former collegiate and professional American football player who played in one American Football League (AFL) season (1962) for the Denver Broncos. Tarr was also a successful college track and field athlete.

Tarr attended the University of Oregon, where he was a two-sport athlete in football and track. In track, Tarr was a member of Oregon's 4 x 110 yard relay team with Mike Gaechter, Harry Jerome, and Mel Renfro, which set a world record in 1962.

Tarr's main event, however, was the 120-yard hurdles. He was the first athlete to win back-to-back NCAA titles in the high hurdles in 1961 and 1962, and in doing so, helped Oregon win its first ever NCAA Men's Outdoor Track and Field Championship in 1962.

Like his relay mates Renfro and Gaechter, Tarr decided to play professional football rather than continue his track career. He played one season with the Denver Broncos of the AFL.

Tarr is a member of the University of Oregon Athletic Hall of Fame and the Oregon Sports Hall of Fame.

See also 
 Other American Football League players

References

1939 births
Living people
Track and field athletes from California
Players of American football from Bakersfield, California
American male hurdlers
American football defensive linemen
Denver Broncos (AFL) players
Oregon Ducks football players
Oregon Ducks men's track and field athletes